Harpagoxenus zaisanicus is a species of ant in the subfamily Myrmicinae. It is endemic to Mongolia.

References

Myrmicinae
Hymenoptera of Asia
Insects of Mongolia
Endemic fauna of Mongolia
Insects described in 1963
Taxonomy articles created by Polbot
Taxobox binomials not recognized by IUCN